Macrosamanea macrocalyx is a species of flowering plant in the family Fabaceae. It is found only in Brazil.

References

macrocalyx
Flora of Brazil
Vulnerable plants
Taxonomy articles created by Polbot
Taxa named by Adolpho Ducke